Curt Nisly (born June 11, 1972) is an American politician who has served in the Indiana House of Representatives from the 22nd district since 2014.

Early life 
Nisly was born in Goshen, Indiana.

Career 
From 1998 to 2005, Nisly worked as a design engineer for Honeyville Metal. He later co-founded C-Tech Solutions, a company that provides sheet metal product development and consulting services.

Nisly was elected to the Indiana House of Representatives in 2014. In the May 2022 Republican primary for re-election to the 22nd district, Nisly was defeated by Craig Snow. In August 2022, Nisly declared his candidacy for the 2022 Indiana's 2nd congressional district special election.

Personal life 
Nisly and his wife, Mary, have four children. Mary is a registered nurse who worked as chair of the Elkhart County Republican Party.

References

1972 births
Living people
Republican Party members of the Indiana House of Representatives
21st-century American politicians
People from Goshen, Indiana
People from Elkhart County, Indiana
People from Kosciusko County, Indiana
Businesspeople from Indiana